The Maid is a 2020 Thai supernatural slasher film directed by Lee Thongkham, written by Lee Thongkham and Piyaluk Tuntisrisakul starring Ploy Sornarin. The film was released on Netflix on 9 July 2020.

Plot

Joy (Ploy Sornarin) is hired as a housemaid by a wealthy family consisting of Uma (Savika Chaiyadej), Nirach (Theerapat Sajakul), and their only child and daughter, Nid (Keetapat Pongrue). Mrs. Wan (Natanee Sitthisaman), the head housemaid, reminds Joy not to pry into the affairs of their employers. Joy experiences odd occurrences around the house, and - ignoring Wan's warning - sneaks into Uma's study at night. She finds a photo of Uma, Nirach, and housemaid Ploy; Ploy is Joy's missing sister. The house is haunted by Ploy's ghost, and only Joy and Nid can see it.

Joy learns of the circumstances surrounding Ploy's death from the ghost. Uma and Nirach have a loveless marriage, and each had a separate intimate relationship with Ploy. Ploy and Nirach had a child, Nid, causing resentment from Uma. Later, Ploy suffered a serious accident. Uma found Ploy first and refused to give or summon aid. Ploy was seemingly dead by the time the rest of the household responded. The household buried Ploy alive, not noticing that she had begun breathing again when their task was nearly complete.

Joy exacts revenge. During a party she murders Uma, Nirach, household staff, and guests, before setting the house on fire and leaving with Nid.

Cast 
 Ploy Sornarin as Joy
 Kannaporn Puangtong as Ploy, Joy's elder sister
 Savika Chaiyadej as Uma
 Teerapat Sajakul as Nirach
 Chi Wah Wong as Lung Sakchai (Uma's Father)
 Ratchanok Suwannaket as Fon
 Venus Saksiri as Joy's friend
 Natanee Sitthisaman as Wan
 Ounruan Rachote
 Alina Homsangpradit as Doctor
 Keetapat Pongrue as Nid
 Sorabodee Changsiri

Reception
The South China Morning Post said the "screenplay is clumsy, and the director’s slow-burn approach does the film no favours."

References

External links
 
 

2020 films
Thai-language films
Thai-language Netflix original films
Thai horror films
Thai slasher films
2020s slasher films
Gothic horror films
Thai ghost films
Serial killer films
Films about mass murder